HMS Wrentham was one of 93 ships of the  of inshore minesweepers.

Their names were all chosen from villages ending in -ham. The minesweeper was named after Wrentham in Suffolk. In 1966 it was sold to Divecon International for conversion as North Sea Diving Service Vessel.

References
Blackman, R.V.B. ed. Jane's Fighting Ships (1953)

 

Ham-class minesweepers
Royal Navy ship names
1955 ships